Meredith Jane Hammat (born 13 July 1969) is an Australian politician. She has been a Labor member of the Western Australian Legislative Assembly since the 2021 state election, representing Mirrabooka.

Hammat graduated from the University of Western Australia with a BA in politics and industrial relations and a MA in labor and industrial relations.

Prior to entering parliament she worked for the Australian Services Union from 1995 to 2012. From 2012 to 2020 she was State Secretary of UnionsWA. In December 2020 she was selected to replace the retiring sitting member, Janine Freeman. In her election campaign Hammat received support through EMILY's List Australia.

In December 2022, she became a parliamentary secretary to Tony Buti, the minister for education, aboriginal affairs, and citizenship and multicultural interests.

References

External links 

 
 

Living people
1969 births 
Australian Labor Party members of the Parliament of Western Australia
Members of the Western Australian Legislative Assembly
Women members of the Western Australian Legislative Assembly
21st-century Australian politicians
21st-century Australian women politicians